The Clemson Tigers baseball teams represented Clemson University in Clemson, South Carolina, United States in the sport of college baseball in the NCAA Division I Atlantic Coast Conference.  The program was established in 1896, and has continuously fielded a team since 1945.  In this decade, the Tigers reached the College World Series in Omaha, Nebraska three times, reached the Super Regional round in 1999 (the only year in the decade which had Super Regionals), and appeared in the NCAA Division I Baseball Championship every year.

1990

Roster

Schedule

1991

1992

Roster

Schedule

1993

Roster

Schedule

1994

Roster

Schedule

1995

1996

1997

Roster

Schedule

1998

Roster

Schedule

Ranking movements

1999

Roster

Schedule

Ranking movements

References

Clemson Tigers baseball seasons